The Phantom of the Opera is a novel by French author Gaston Leroux. It has been successfully adapted into various stage and film adaptations, most notable of which are the 1925 film depiction featuring Lon Chaney, and Andrew Lloyd Webber's 1986 musical.

History behind the novel 
At the paper, he wrote about and critiqued dramas, as well as being a courtroom reporter. With his job, he was able to travel frequently, but he returned to Paris where he became a writer. Because of his fascination with both Edgar Allan Poe and Sir Arthur Conan Doyle, he wrote a detective mystery entitled The Mystery of the Yellow Room in 1907, and four years later he published . The novel was first published in newspapers before finally being published as a book. 

The setting of The Phantom of the Opera is the actual Paris opera house, the Palais Garnier. Leroux had heard the rumours about the time the opera house was finished, and these rumours became closely linked with the novel: Act One of the opera Helle had just finished when a fire in the roof of the opera house melted through a wire holding a counterweight for the chandelier, causing a crash that injured several and killed one. Using this accident paired with rumors of a ghost in that same opera house, Leroux wrote  and published it in 1910, which was later published in English as The Phantom of the Opera. The underground "lake" that he wrote about, in reality an enormous cistern, does exist beneath the opera house, and it is still used for training firefighters to swim in the dark.

The serialized version contains an entire chapter that does not appear in the novel version—though much of its content was added in other chapters—and was not reprinted in English until 2014.

Plot summary  
In the 1880s, in Paris, the Palais Garnier Opera House is believed to be haunted by an entity known as the Phantom of the Opera, or simply the Opera Ghost. A stagehand named Joseph Buquet is found hanged, the noose around his neck missing. 

At a gala performance for the retirement of the opera house's two managers, a young, little-known Swedish soprano, Christine Daaé, is called upon to sing in place of the Opera's leading soprano, Carlotta, who is ill, and Christine’s performance is an astonishing success. The Vicomte Raoul de Chagny, who was present at the performance, recognizes her as his childhood playmate and recalls his love for her. He attempts to visit her backstage, where he hears a man complimenting her from inside her dressing room. He investigates the room once Christine leaves, only to find it empty.

At Perros-Guirec, Christine meets with Raoul, who confronts her about the voice he heard in her room. Christine tells him she has been tutored by the Angel of Music, whom her father used to tell them about. When Raoul suggests that she might be the victim of a prank, she storms off. Christine visits her father's grave one night, where a mysterious figure appears and plays the violin for her. Raoul attempts to confront it but is attacked and knocked out in the process.

Back at the Palais Garnier, the new managers receive a letter from the Phantom demanding that they allow Christine to perform the lead role of Marguerite in Faust and that Box 5 be left empty for his use, lest they perform in a house with a curse on it. The managers assume his demands are a prank and ignore them, resulting in disastrous consequences, as Carlotta ends up croaking like a toad, and a spectator dies after the chandelier suddenly drops into the audience. The Phantom, having abducted Christine from her dressing room, reveals himself as a deformed man called Erik.

Erik intends to hold her prisoner in his lair with him for a few days. Still, she causes him to change his plans when she unmasks him and, to the horror of both, beholds his noseless, sunken-eyed face, which resembles a skull dried up by the centuries. Fearing that she will leave him, he decides to hold her permanently, but when Christine requests release after two weeks, he agrees on the condition that she wear his ring and be faithful to him.

On the roof of the Opera House, Christine tells Raoul about her abduction and makes Raoul promise to take her away to a place where Erik can never find her, even if she resists. Raoul tells Christine he will act on his promise the next day, to which she agrees. However, Christine sympathizes with Erik and decides to sing for him one last time as a means of saying goodbye. Unbeknownst to Christine and Raoul, Erik has been watching them and overheard their whole conversation.

The following night, the enraged and jealous Erik abducts Christine during a production of Faust and tries to force her to marry him. Raoul is led by a mysterious Opera regular known only as "The Persian" into Erik's secret lair deep in the bowels of the Opera House. Still, they end up trapped in a mirrored room by Erik, who threatens that unless Christine agrees to marry him, he will kill them and everyone in the Opera House by using explosives.

Christine agrees to marry Erik. Erik initially tries to drown Raoul and the Persian, using the water which would have been used to douse the explosives. Still, Christine begs and offers to be his "living bride", promising him not to kill herself after becoming his bride, as she had just attempted suicide. Erik eventually releases Raoul and the Persian from his torture chamber.

When Erik is alone with Christine, he lifts his mask to kiss her on her forehead and is eventually given a kiss back. Erik reveals that he has never kissed anyone, including his own mother, who would run away if he ever tried to kiss her. He is overcome with emotion. He and Christine then cry together, and their tears "mingle." She also holds his hand and says, "Poor, unhappy Erik," which reduces him to "a dog ready to die for her."

He allows the Persian and Raoul to escape, though not before making Christine promise that she will visit him on his death day and return the gold ring he gave her. He also makes the Persian promise that afterward, he will go to the newspaper and report his death, as he will die soon "of love."

Indeed, sometime later, Christine returns to Erik's lair and by his request, buries him someplace where he will never be found, and returns the gold ring. Afterward, a local newspaper runs the simple note: "Erik is dead."  Christine and Raoul elope together, never to return.

The epilogue pieces together bits of Erik's life, information that "the narrator" obtained from the Persian. It is revealed that Erik was the son of a construction business owner, deformed at birth. He ran away from his native Normandy to work in fairs and caravans, schooling himself in the arts of the circus across Europe and Asia, and eventually building trick palaces in Persia and Turkey. Eventually, he returned to France and started his own construction business. After being subcontracted to work on the Palais Garnier's foundations, Erik had discreetly built himself a lair to disappear in, complete with hidden passages and other tricks that allowed him to spy on the managers.

Characters 
 Erik: The Phantom of the Opera, a deformed conjurer also referred to as the Angel of Music and the Opera Ghost. He tutors and eventually becomes obsessed with Christine Daaé.
 Christine Daaé: A young Swedish soprano at the Paris Opera House with whom the Phantom develops a deep obsession.
 Vicomte Raoul de Chagny: Christine's childhood friend with whom she renews a youthful love.
 The Persian: A mysterious man from Erik's past.
 Comte Philippe de Chagny: Raoul's older brother.
 Armand Moncharmin and Firmin Richard: The new managers of the opera house.
 Madame Giry:  The opera's box keeper (Mother of Meg).
 Meg Giry: Often referred to as "Little Meg", Madame Giry's daughter, a ballet girl. 
 Debienne and Poligny: The previous managers of the opera house.
 Carlotta: A spoiled prima donna; the lead soprano of the Paris Opera House.
 Madame Valérius: Christine's elderly guardian.

Themes

Music 
Leroux uses the operatic setting in The Phantom of the Opera to use music as a device for foreshadowing. Ribière makes note that Leroux was once a theatre critic and his brother was a musician, so he was knowledgeable about music and how to use it as a framing device. She uses the example of how Leroux introduces Danse Macabre which means "dance of death" in the gala scene which foreshadows the graveyard scene that comes later where the Phantom plays the fiddle for Christine and attacks Raoul when he tries to intervene.

Drumright points out that music is evident throughout the novel in that it is the basis for Christine and Erik's relationship. Christine sees Erik as her Angel of Music that her father promised would come to her one day. The Phantom sees Christine as his musical protégé, and he uses his passion for music to teach her everything he knows.

Mystery
Stylistically, the novel is framed as a mystery novel as it is narrated through a detective pulling his information from various forms of research. The mystery being uncovered is the Phantom who lurks through the opera house, seemingly appearing in places out of nowhere as if by magic. But, it seems that the mystery novel persona was a facade for the real genre being more of a Gothic romance.

Gothic horror
In his article, Fitzpatrick compares the Phantom to other monsters featured in Gothic horror novels such as Frankenstein's monster, Dr. Jekyll, Dorian Gray, and Count Dracula. The Phantom has a torture chamber where he kidnaps and kills people, and the walls of the chapel in the graveyard are lined with human bones. Drumright notes that The Phantom of the Opera checks off every trope necessary to have a Gothic novel according to the Encyclopedia of Literature's description which says, "Such novels were expected to be dark and tempestuous and full of ghosts, madness, outrage,
superstition, and revenge." Although the Phantom is really just a deformed man, he has ghost-like qualities in that no one can ever find him or his lair and he is seen as a monster. People are frightened by him because of his deformities and the acts of violence he commits.

Romance
The novel features a love triangle between the Phantom, Christine, and Raoul. Raoul is seen as Christine's childhood love whom she is familiar with and has affection for. He is rich and therefore offers her security as well as a wholesome, Christian marriage. The Phantom, on the other hand, is not familiar. He is dark, ugly, and dangerous and therefore represents the forbidden love. However, Christine is drawn to him because she sees him as her Angel of Music, and she pities his existence of loneliness and darkness.

Critical reception 

By the time Leroux published The Phantom of the Opera, he had already gained credibility as a crime mystery author in both French- and English-speaking countries. He had written six novels prior, two of which had garnered substantial popularity within their first year of publication called The Mystery of the Yellow Room and The Perfume of the Lady in Black. Although previous commentators have asserted that The Phantom of the Opera did not attain as much success as these previous novels, being particularly unpopular in France where it was first published, recent research into the novel's early reception and sales has indicated the contrary. One book review from the New York Times expressed disappointment in the way the phantom was portrayed, saying that the feeling of suspense and horror is lost once it is found out that the phantom is just a man. The majority of the notability that the novel acquired early on was due to its publication in a series of installments in French, American, and English newspapers. This serialized version of the story became important when it was read and sought out by Universal Pictures to be adapted into a movie in 1925. Leroux did not live to see all the success from his novel and its subsequent critical re-evaluation; he died in April 1927.

Adaptations 

There have been many literary and other dramatic works based on Leroux's novel, ranging from stage musicals to films to children's books. Some well-known stage and screen adaptations of the novel are the 1925 film and the Andrew Lloyd Webber musical.
    
Leroux's novel was made into two silent films. The first film version, a German adaptation called , is now a lost film. It was made in 1916 and was directed by Ernest Matray.

The next adaptation into a silent film was made in 1925 by Universal Studios. This version stars Lon Chaney as the Phantom. Due to tensions on the set, there was a switch in directors and Edward Sedgwick finished the film while changing the direction the movie was going to take. His take on the novel and making it a dark romantic movie with comedy was not popular with audiences. Finally, the film was reworked one last time by Maurice Pivar and Lois Weber. They removed most of Sedgwick's contribution and returned to the original focus. This time, the movie was a success with audiences in 1925.
           
In Lloyd Webber's musical, he was focused on writing more of a romance piece and found the book and the musical took off from there. Leroux's novel was more than just a mystery and had romance and other genres that would appeal to more audiences. Lloyd Webber used accounts from within the novel in the musical as well such as the real-life event of the chandelier falling. When Andrew Lloyd Webber created the musical, there started to be disagreements over whether it was "inspired by" or "based on" Gaston Leroux's novel. Bill O'Connell, an assistant to film producers in New York, contended for the original author's name to be included with the book that the musical is "based on" rather than "inspired by" because he viewed the latter as a minimization of Gaston Leroux's connection with the story. This was first produced in the mid-80s and has continued to remain popular, still running on Broadway and the West End and spawning multiple touring productions. The musical has received more than fifty awards and is seen by many as being the most popular musical on Broadway.

References

External links

 
 
 

 
1909 French novels
1910 French novels
1909 fantasy novels
1910 fantasy novels
French horror fiction
Novels set in the 1880s
Novels set in Paris
French novels adapted into films
Novels adapted into comics
French novels adapted into plays
Novels adapted into radio programs
French novels adapted into television shows
Novels adapted into video games
French Gothic novels
Works originally published in Le Gaulois
Novels first published in serial form
French mystery novels
French horror novels
French romance novels
Novels about music
Novels by Gaston Leroux